Marco Baldineti (born 6 July 1960) is an Italian water polo player. He competed in the men's tournament at the 1984 Summer Olympics.

References

External links
 

1960 births
Living people
Italian male water polo players
Olympic water polo players of Italy
Water polo players at the 1984 Summer Olympics
Sportspeople from Tijuana